Pascali's Island may refer to:
 Pascali's Island (novel), a 1980 novel by Barry Unsworth
 Pascali's Island (film), a 1988 film written and directed by James Dearden